The Science Fiction Hall of Fame, Volume One, 1929–1964 is a 1970 anthology of English language science fiction short stories, edited by Robert Silverberg.   Author Lester del Rey said that "it even lives up to its subtitle", referring to the volume's boast of containing "The Greatest Science-Fiction Stories of All Time".

It was first published by Doubleday and subsequently reprinted by Avon Books in July 1971 (Library of Congress Card Catalog Number: 70-97691), and later by Orb.

The book was first published in the UK in 1971 by Victor Gollancz Ltd and in paperback by First Sphere Books in 1972 (in two volumes, split after "First Contact").

The content of the book was decided by a vote of the members of the Science Fiction Writers of America, choosing among short stories (up to 15,000 words long) that predated the Nebula Awards. Among the top 15 vote-getters, one (Arthur C. Clarke's "The Star") was disqualified in order to prevent any writer from being represented twice; it was replaced by the 16th-place finisher ("Arena"), and the resulting list of 15 stories was included in the collection. Silverberg then used his judgment, rather than the strict vote count, in selecting 11 of the next 15, for a total of 26 stories.

In 1973, it was followed by The Science Fiction Hall of Fame, Volume Two: The Greatest Science Fiction Novellas of All Time. Further volumes were published, consisting of early Nebula winners, thus straying outside the original "pre-Nebula" concept.

Contents

Reception
Algis Budrys, finding the story selection inexact, concluded that "the book is as advertised – a basic one-volume library of the short science fiction story," but that "you should also leave space beside it."

See also

 Nebula Award for Best Short Story
 The Science Fiction Hall of Fame, Volume Two

References

1970 anthologies
Science fiction anthology series
Science Fiction Hall of Fame 1
Doubleday (publisher) books